Christopher Denham is an American actor, screenwriter and director. He is perhaps best known for supporting roles in Argo, Being the Ricardos, Shutter Island and his role in the Sundance Film Festival cult phenomenon, Sound of My Voice, as well as the television series Billions, Shining Girls, opposite Elisabeth Moss and Amazon Prime's Utopia, created by Gillian Flynn.

Early life
Denham grew up on the south side of Chicago. He attended the University of Illinois at Urbana-Champaign where he studied acting and creative writing.

Theatrical career
Denham made his Broadway debut opposite Danny Glover in the 2003 revival of "Master Harold"...and the Boys. In 2005, Denham originated the role of Matt in the Steppenwolf Theater production of Adam Rapp's Red Light Winter. The production moved to New York where Denham won Outstanding Lead Actor at the 2006 Lucille Lortel Awards.
His other Broadway credits include the title role in Martin McDonagh's The Lieutenant of Inishmore and David Mamet's China Doll, opposite Al Pacino. Off-Broadway, Denham appeared at Playwright's Horizons in Adam Rapp's Kindness opposite Katherine Waterston, Charles Mee's Wintertime at Second Stage, and Steven Levenson's The Unavoidable Disappearance of Tom Durnin, opposite David Morse at Roundabout Theatre Company. Regionally, Denham has worked with the Illinois Shakespeare Festival, New York Stage and Film and the Sundance Lab for Directors and Screenwriters.

Film and television career
Denham's first major film role was as CIA paramilitary operations officer Mike Vickers in Charlie Wilson's War, directed by Mike Nichols. He starred opposite Brit Marling in the acclaimed  psychological thriller Sound of My Voice which premiered at the Sundance Film Festival. His breakout film role was as Mark Lijek, one of the six escaped hostages rescued by Tony Mendez in Argo.
Denham later portrayed scientist Jim Meeks on the Emmy-nominated Manhattan. In 2017, he joined the cast of Billions as attorney Oliver Dake. He appeared as Sheriff Peter Trask in Craig Zobel's One Dollar, which premiered on CBS All Access. In 2020, he was a series regular in Gillian Flynn's Utopia as Arby. Denham has collaborated with legendary directors Martin Scorsese (Shutter Island), Mike Nichols (Charlie Wilson's War), Barry Levinson (The Bay), Tony Gilroy (Duplicity), Jodie Foster (Money Monster) and Aaron Sorkin (Being The Ricardos).  Other TV credits include: Rubicon, Person of Interest, The Good Wife, Prodigal Son, Law and Order, Law and Order: SVU, and The Following.

Denham wrote and directed the 2008 horror film Home Movie (IFC Films) which premiered at Toronto After Dark and won the Citizen Kane Award for up-and-coming director at the Sitges Film Festival. He also wrote and directed the critically acclaimed thriller, Preservation, starring Wrenn Schmidt, Pablo Schreiber and Aaron Staton. which debuted at the Tribeca Film Festival and was distributed by The Orchard.

Denham has been announced to appear in Christopher Nolan’s film, Oppenheimer, for Universal Pictures, which is currently in production. He will also appear in HBO's The Gilded Age, created by Julian Fellowes.

Filmography

Film

Television

Stage

Awards and nominations

References

External links
 
 

American male film actors
American male stage actors
American male television actors
American film directors
American film producers
American male screenwriters
Living people
Outstanding Performance by a Cast in a Motion Picture Screen Actors Guild Award winners
1980 births